Thanjavur Municipal Corporation is a civic body that governs Thanjavur city, India. It has been awarded as the Best municipal corporation in Tamilnadu in 2021. This corporation consist of 51 wards and the legislative body is headed by an elected Chairperson assisted by a Deputy Chairperson and 51 councillors who represent each wards in the city.

Government of Tamil Nadu announced for upgrade of Thanjavur Special Grade Municipality to City Municipal Corporation of Thanjavur on April 10th 2014.

References 

Thanjavur
Municipal corporations in Tamil Nadu
2014 establishments in Tamil Nadu
Thanjavur district